Michael Keith McRae (born July 9, 1955, in Pembroke, North Carolina) is a retired long jumper from the United States, who represented his native country at the 1984 Summer Olympics in Los Angeles, California. There he finished in eleventh place.  McRae competed for Chabot College in Hayward, California.  He was the national champion, winning the TAC Championships at nearby San Jose City College, in 1984.

References
 
 1983 Year Ranking

External links
 

1955 births
Living people
People from Pembroke, North Carolina
American male long jumpers
Athletes (track and field) at the 1984 Summer Olympics
Olympic track and field athletes of the United States
Track and field athletes from California